is a Japanese alpine skier and Paralympic athlete.

He competed in the 2006 Winter Paralympics in Torino, Italy, where he became
4th in the Downhill and 12th in the Slalom, sitting.

He competed in the 2010 Winter Paralympics in Vancouver, British Columbia, Canada.
He won a bronze medal in the Giant Slalom, sitting. He became 5th at the Super combined, 5th in the Super-G, 11th at the Downhill and 15th at the Slalom, sitting.

References

 
 Athlete Search Results – Suzuki, Takeshi, International Paralympic Committee (IPC)

1988 births
Living people
Japanese male alpine skiers
Paralympic alpine skiers of Japan
Alpine skiers at the 2010 Winter Paralympics
Paralympic bronze medalists for Japan
Medalists at the 2014 Winter Paralympics
Medalists at the 2010 Winter Paralympics
Alpine skiers at the 2006 Winter Paralympics
Alpine skiers at the 2014 Winter Paralympics
Alpine skiers at the 2022 Winter Paralympics
Recipients of the Medal with Purple Ribbon
Paralympic medalists in alpine skiing
21st-century Japanese people